The Last Confession is a stage play by Roger Crane about the election and death of Pope John Paul I. The play follows Giovanni Benelli who recounts, during his last confession, his role in the death of John Paul and how this led him to lose his faith. It premiered at the Chichester Festival Theatre on 27 April 2007.

Plot
Disturbed by the corruption in Vatican City, caused mainly by Paul Marcinkus and Jean-Marie Villot, Benelli attempts to manipulate the August 1978 conclave and elect Albino Luciani as Pope. The plan succeeds and Luciani becomes Pope John Paul I but his unconventional views and actions make him enemies in the Curia.

Just thirty-three days into his reign, John Paul dies suddenly and Benelli investigates the death, suspecting the Pope was murdered. Realising that a request for an autopsy would damage the church, Benelli decides to end the investigation and tries to become Pope himself. This time his efforts to manipulate the conclave fail and a compromise candidate, Karol Wojtyła, is elected Pope.

Cast
David Suchet - Cardinal Giovanni Benelli
Michael Jayston - The Confessor
Richard O'Callaghan - Cardinal Albino Luciani / Pope John Paul I
Bernard Lloyd - Cardinal Jean Villot
Stuart Milligan - Bishop Paul Marcinkus
Clifford Rose - Pope Paul VI
Charles Kay - Cardinal Pericle Felici
John Franklyn-Robbins - Cardinal Alfredo Ottaviani
Bruce Purchase - Cardinal Sebastiano Baggio
Joseph Mydell - Cardinal Bernardin Gantin
Michael Cronin - Cardinal Leo Joseph Suenens
Joseph Long - Cardinal Aloisio Lorscheider
Roger May - Monsignor John Magee
Paul Foster - Father Diego Lorenzi
Christopher Mellows - Dr. Buzzonetti & Thomas
Maroussia Frank - Sister Vincenza

References

External links
First production at the Chichester Festival Theatre
Review in thestage.co.uk
The Theatre Royal Haymarket
 The Villain Always Wears Red (scroll down)
The Last Confession - Australian tour (retrieved 2014-09-28)

2007 plays
British plays
Cultural depictions of Pope John Paul I
Plays based on actual events
Plays based on real people
Plays set in Italy
Plays set in the 1970s
Plays set in Vatican City